Jakub Drozd (born 13 June 2003) is a Czech professional footballer who plays as a midfielder for FC Baník Ostrava.

Club career 
Drozd made his professional debut for FC Baník Ostrava on 14 June 2020.After that he played in 4 another games and have 5 starts in First Czech League

References

External links

2003 births
Living people
Czech footballers
Czech Republic youth international footballers
Association football midfielders
FC Baník Ostrava players
Czech First League players